The Manchester Marathon is a long-distance running event in Greater Manchester, England.  It was known as the Greater Manchester Marathon until the word "Greater" was dropped beginning with the (cancelled) 2020 edition of the race.  The most recent marathon was held on 7 April 2019, and finished at Old Trafford Cricket Ground. The race was first held in 2012. It is claimed that the race is the flattest marathon course in the UK, with only  of elevation. The 2013, 2014 and 2015 Greater Manchester Marathon times have been declared invalid after the course was found to be 380m too short.

History
The first marathon in the Manchester area was run in 1908 and started and finished at the Saracen's Head pub in Warburton, although at this point the run was  only.  The first marathon to be run over 26 miles and 385 yards was the race in 1909, it started in Sandbach, Cheshire and finished at the Fallowfield Stadium in Manchester.  A marathon has been run along various routes in the Manchester area intermittently throughout the years with various start and finish points. Until 2012, the last marathon to be held in the city was in 2002, with the 10 km Great Manchester Run superseding it as the major running event in Manchester.

The 2020 edition of the race was cancelled due to the coronavirus pandemic, with all entries automatically remaining valid for 2021, and all registrants given the options of transferring their entry to another runner for a 10 GBP fee or obtaining a refund minus a 5 GBP administration fee.

Similarly, the 2021 edition of the race, originally scheduled for April, was postponed to  due to the pandemic.

Course 
The current course finishes at Old Trafford cricket ground and passes a number of famous Manchester landmarks including the Old Trafford football ground. It works its way through Chorlton, Hulme, Old Trafford, Stretford, Sale, Timperley, Altrincham, Urmston, Salford, and Manchester City Centre.

The 2013, 2014 and 2015 route was subsequently found to be  short of the correct distance.

From 2020, the route will change to allow the inclusion of a three-mile loop through the city centre.

Invalid races
The 2013, 2014 and 2015 Greater Manchester Marathon times have been declared invalid after the course was found to be 380m too short in 2016. UK Athletics will not recognise times from those races.  The error was corrected in time for 2016 marathon. The Association of UK Course Measurers (AUKCM) said an accredited measurer had ridden the course in 2013 but indicated there had been an error in the calibration of the bicycle wheel. Marathon courses are measured out using a bicycle fitted with a counter to calculate distance by the turning of the wheels.

Winners 
Key:
  Course record

Prizes
Prizes of equal value are awarded to men and women as follows:
 1st prize £750 cash
 2nd prize £500 cash
 3rd prize £250 cash
 4th prize £200 cash
 5th prize £150 cash
 6th prize £140 cash
 7th prize £130 cash
 8th prize £120 cash
 9th prize £110 cash
 10th prize £100 cash

Time bonuses are also awarded for men running under 2 hours 20 minutes and women running under 2 hours 30 minutes and ASICS vouchers are awarded to the fastest man and woman in each age group.

See also
 List of marathon races in Europe

Notes

References

Marathons in the United Kingdom
Sport in Greater Manchester